Skankin' Pickle Fever is the second studio album by American ska punk band Skankin' Pickle, released in 1992 on the band's own label, Dill Records.

According to Allmusic, Skankin' Pickle Fever was recorded over the course of three days on a budget of $2,000.

Saxophonist Roland Alphonso of The Skatalites makes a guest appearance on the dub song "Roland Alphonso's Dub".

CD track listing
"The Hussein Skank" – 3:22
"Pseudo Punk" – 2:26
"Silly Willy" – 2:32
"Ice Cube, Korea Wants A Word With You" – 1:30
"Toothless And Grey" – 3:17
"Pass You By" – 1:59
"The Dub" – 4:16
"Song #3" – 0:52
"Whatever Happened" – 3:22
"Anxiety Attack" – 2:51
"Skinless Friend" – 2:20
"Larry Smith" – 2:56
"I Missed The Bus" – 3:16
"Roland Alphonso's Dub" – 5:11
"Hand Twister" – 2:35
"David Duke Is Running For President" – 1:22
"Hit My Brain" – 3:21

Personnel
Lynette Knackstedt - guitar, vocals, lead vocals on tracks 5 and 15
Gerry Lundquist - slide trombone, vocals
Mike "Mr. Clean" Mattingly - bass guitar, vocals, lead vocals on tracks 2, 3, 6, 9, 11 and 17
Lars Nylander - valve trombone, vocals
Mike "Bruce Lee" Park - saxophone, vocals, lead vocals on tracks 1, 4, 8, 10, 12, 13 and 16
Chuck Phelps - drums

Additional musicians
Roland Alphonso - tenor saxophone on track 14
Robert Berry - Hammond organ

References

1992 albums
Skankin' Pickle albums